Palaeospheniscus patagonicus is the type species of the penguin genus Palaeospheniscus, which is known from fossils.

Description 
This species is known from several dozen bones, found in Early Miocene strata of the Gaiman Formation. The specimens from known localities were collected near Trelew and Gaiman in Chubut Province, Argentina.

Currently, there is some debate about whether Palaeospheniscus wimani is a synonym of this species or not.

References

Further reading 
 Moreno, Francisco "Perito" & Mercerat, A. (1891): Catálogo de los pájaros fósiles de la República Argentina conservados en el Museo de La Plata. Anales del Museo de La Plata 1: 7-71, 21 plates.
 Simpson, George Gaylord (1946): Fossil penguins. Bull. Am. Mus. Nat. Hist. 87: 7-99. PDF fulltext
 Simpson, George Gaylord (1971): Conspectus of Patagonian fossil penguins. American Museum Novitates 2488: 1-37. PDF fulltext

Palaeospheniscus
Extinct penguins
Miocene birds of South America
Friasian
Santacrucian
Colhuehuapian
Neogene Argentina
Fossils of Argentina
Gaiman Formation
Fossil taxa described in 1891